Norman 'Norm' Bussell (born 6 January 1945) is a former Australian rules footballer who played with Hawthorn in the VFL.

Early career

Bussell was a highly rated youngster from the town of   Wangaratta. He developed with the help of VFL legend Bob Rose, who was coaching one of the two Wangaratta teams in the Ovens and Murray FL.
When Rose was appointed to coach  he got Bussell to sign a Form Four registration tying him to Collingwood. Bussell refused to move to Melbourne as he was competing an Auto Electrical apprenticeship. A few years later after his form four had expired, Hawthorn managed to persuade Bussell to move to Hawthorn.

VFL career
Bussell was a centre half back and his no fuss tough approach to the game saw him play 113 games. 

The highlight of his career was the 1971 Premiership. Bussell played an important role in one of the most brutal games in VFL history.

After VFL

After substaining a back injury Bussell decided to retire from VFL football. He returned to  Wangaratta and played with his original team, the Wangaratta Rovers. He played in two premierships before retiring from the game. 

His son Aidan was drafted by Hawthorn 1991 AFL draft but he never played a game.

External links

1945 births
Australian rules footballers from Victoria (Australia)
Hawthorn Football Club players
Hawthorn Football Club Premiership players
Wangaratta Rovers Football Club players
Living people
One-time VFL/AFL Premiership players